Markus Rainer Mattsson (born July 30, 1957) is a former professional ice hockey goaltender. He was one of the first goaltenders in the NHL from Finland. He is also the goalie who ended Wayne Gretzky's 51-game point streak in 1983–84.

Markus has a son, Niklas, who played ice hockey for Ilves and Suomi-sarja-team HC Montreal Tampere.

Career statistics

Regular season and playoffs

International

External links
 

1957 births
Living people
Birmingham South Stars players
Finnish ice hockey goaltenders
Houston Aeros draft picks
Ilves players
Los Angeles Kings players
Minnesota North Stars players
New Haven Nighthawks players
New York Islanders draft picks
Quebec Nordiques (WHA) players
Tappara players
Tulsa Oilers (1964–1984) players
Winnipeg Jets (1979–1996) players
Winnipeg Jets (WHA) players
People from Nokia, Finland
Sportspeople from Pirkanmaa